David Francis Marr, Jr. (December 27, 1933 – October 5, 1997) was an American professional golfer and sportscaster, best known for winning the 1965 PGA Championship.

Early years
Marr was born and raised in Houston, Texas, the son of a professional golfer. He attended St. Thomas High School, and while there was on the honor roll, captain of the golf team and member of the Letterman's Club. Following graduation, he attended Rice Institute and the University of Houston.

Professional career
In 1953 at age 19, Marr left college and turned professional. He began his professional golfing career by accepting a position at Westwood Country Club in Westwood, New Jersey, in 1953. A short time later, Marr took a job as an assistant club pro to Claude Harmon at Winged Foot Golf Club in Mamaroneck, New York, where he began to blossom. He began playing regularly on the PGA tour in 1960, and in that year earned his first professional win at the Sam Snead Festival. A year later, he won the Greater Seattle Open Invitational and then the Azalea Open in 1962. Marr joined the elite in golf world in 1965 when he captured the coveted PGA Championship, was named to the Ryder Cup team and elected PGA Player of the Year.

The 1965 PGA Championship was played at the Laurel Valley Golf Club in Ligonier, Pennsylvania. He defeated golf legends Jack Nicklaus and Billy Casper by two strokes with a four-day total score of 280. Incredibly, this wasn't the biggest news story of the day in the Marr family – a few hours after his victory, his third child, son Tony, was born.

Marr played in the 1965 Ryder Cup, finishing his six matches with a 4-2 record. He was the appointed non-playing captain of the U.S. Ryder Cup team in 1981.

Marr was a close friend of golf legend Arnold Palmer. Marr and Palmer were both sons of PGA pros and developed a close bond. Palmer called Marr's 1965 PGA victory "one of the happiest moments of my life," won at Palmer's home course. The two of them used to joke that between them they won a career grand slam. (Palmer won seven majors in his career, but never the PGA Championship, where he was a runner-up three times.)

Later years
Marr served as a golf analyst for ABC from 1972 until 1991, and was usually teamed with host Jim McKay and fellow one-time PGA Championship winner, Bob Rosburg. He later worked for the BBC in Britain and NBC in the U.S.

Marr and long-time golfing partner Jay Riviere established a golf course architectural and design firm in 1981, and designed many Texas courses and one each in Louisiana and Arizona.

After a battle with stomach cancer, Marr died at age 63 at the M.D. Anderson Cancer Center in Houston on October 5, 1997. He was survived by his wife, Tally, and sons Dave III, Anthony, Wayne Bunch, Tucker Bunch, and daughter Elizabeth Hallas. Marr's oldest son, Dave III, works for Golf Channel covering the Champions Tour.

Marr's children scattered his ashes around the various courses that meant so much to him during his playing days – Royal Birkdale, in England, where he played on the 1965 Ryder Cup team; Walton Heath, also in England, where he captained the 1981 Ryder Cup team; at the 18th hole at Laurel Valley, the site of his 1965 PGA Championship, along with Memorial Park Golf Course in Houston.

Awards and honors
Marr was elected to the National Collegiate Hall of Fame in 1977 and the Texas Golf Hall of Fame in 1978. He was selected for the Gold Tee Award presented by the Met (N.Y.) Golf Writers in 1990.

Shell Oil Company created the Dave Marr Memorial Award the year after his death. It is awarded annually in conjunction with the Shell Houston Open. Marr's last assignment as a broadcaster had been to host Shell's Wonderful World of Golf from 1993–97. Past winners of the award include Gene Sarazen, Byron Nelson, Jack Nicklaus, Judy Rankin, Gary Player, Former President George H. W. Bush and Arnold Palmer.

Professional wins (5)

PGA Tour wins (3)

PGA Tour playoff record (2–0)

Other wins (2)
1960 Sam Snead Festival
1962 Metropolitan PGA Championship

Major championships

Wins (1)

Results timeline

CUT = missed the half-way cut
"T" = tied

Summary

Most consecutive cuts made – 8 (1966 U.S. Open – 1968 U.S. Open)
Longest streak of top-10s – 2 (1966 U.S. Open – 1966 Open Championship)

See also
List of men's major championships winning golfers

References

External links

American male golfers
Houston Cougars men's golfers
PGA Tour golfers
Ryder Cup competitors for the United States
Winners of men's major golf championships
Golf writers and broadcasters
Golfers from Houston
Rice University alumni
St. Thomas High School (Houston, Texas) alumni
Deaths from stomach cancer
Deaths from cancer in Texas
1933 births
1997 deaths